Little Orphan Annie is a 1938 American comedy film directed by Ben Holmes, and written by Budd Schulberg and Samuel Ornitz. It is based on the comic strip Little Orphan Annie by Harold Gray. The film stars Ann Gillis, Robert Kent, June Travis, J. Farrell MacDonald, and J.M. Kerrigan. The film was released on December 2, 1938, by Paramount Pictures.

Plot
Annie (Ann Gillis), an orphan (based on Harold Gray's comic strip), is befriended by a fight manager, "Pop" Corrigan (J. Farrell MacDonald). She brings him Johnny Adams (Robert Kent), a promising prizefighter. Annie gets the people of the neighborhood to finance his training. But on the night of Johnny's big fight, a gambling syndicate locks him in a gymnasium, and it appears the neighborhood folks will lose their investment.

Cast 
Ann Gillis as Annie
Robert Kent as Johnny Adams
June Travis as Mary Ellen
J. Farrell MacDonald as "Pop" Corrigan
J.M. Kerrigan as Tom Jennings
Margaret Armstrong as Mrs. Jennings
Sarah Padden as Mrs. Nora Moriarty
James Burke as Mike Moriarty
Ian Maclaren as Soo Long
Dorothy Vaughan as Mrs. Milligan
Ben Welden as Spot McGee
Charles Coleman as The Butler
Eddie Gribbon as Monk
Vince Lombardi as Ska-Booch
Harry Tyler as O.O. Pike
Jack Rice as Bugs MacIntosh
Tommy Bupp as Timmie Milligan
Charles C. Wilson as Val Lewis
Dick Rich as Hutch

References

External links 
 

1938 films
1938 comedy films
American black-and-white films
American boxing films
American comedy films
Films about orphans
Films based on American comics
Films based on comic strips
Films directed by Ben Holmes
Films based on Little Orphan Annie
Films with screenplays by Budd Schulberg
Live-action films based on comics
Paramount Pictures films
1930s English-language films
1930s American films
English-language comedy films